Ocotea harrisii is a species of plant in the genus Ocotea of the family Lauraceae. It is an evergreen tree endemic to Jamaica.  It is threatened by habitat loss.

References

harrisii
Endemic flora of Jamaica
Trees of Jamaica
Critically endangered flora of North America
Taxonomy articles created by Polbot